This Time It's Personal may refer to:

This Time It's Personal (Somethin' for the People album), 1997
This Time It's Personal (John Cooper Clarke and Hugh Cornwell album), 2017
 WEC 7: This Time It's Personal, an American mixed martial arts event
 This Time Its Personal, a 2000 album by Fury of Five
 This Time... It's Personal, a 2000 album by Michael Ball
 Periphery II: This Time It's Personal, a 2012 album by Periphery
 Tagline for the 1987 film Jaws: The Revenge